This list includes 35 state parks, public reserved lands, and state historic sites in  the U.S. state of Maine. They are operated by the Maine Department of Conservation, with the exceptions of Baxter State Park, which is operated by the Baxter State Park Authority, and Peacock Beach, which is under local management.

State parks

State historic sites

Public reserved lands

See also
List of U.S. national parks
Maine Wildlife Management Areas (WMA)

References

External links
Official Maine State Parks search site

 
Maine state parks
state parks